The regions (viloyat) of Uzbekistan are divided into 175 districts (tuman). The districts are listed by region, in the general direction from west to east.

Karakalpakstan

Taxiatosh District was created in 2017 from part of Xoʻjayli District. Boʻzatov District was created in September 2019 from parts of the Kegeyli District and the Chimboy District.

Xorazm

Navoiy

Bukhara

Samarqand

Qashqadaryo

Surxondaryo

Jizzakh

Sirdaryo

Tashkent

Namangan

Fergana

Ohunboboev District was renamed to Qoʻshtepa District in August 2010.

Andijan

Tashkent City 
  
Since 2020, when the Yangihayot district was created, Tashkent is divided into 12 districts.

References

 
Subdivisions of Uzbekistan
Uzbekistan, Districts
Uzbekistan 2
Districts, Uzbekistan
Uzbekistan geography-related lists